Elachista neithanella is a moth of the family Elachistidae. It is found in Canada, where it has been recorded from Saskatchewan.

References

neithanella
Moths described in 1999
Moths of North America
Organisms named after Tolkien and his works